Ionuț Bădescu (born 25 January 1978 in Câmpulung, Romania) is a Romanian former footballer who played as a midfielder.

External links
 

1978 births
Living people
Sportspeople from Piatra Neamț
Romanian footballers
Association football midfielders
FCV Farul Constanța players
Neftochimic Burgas players
ASC Oțelul Galați players
CSM Ceahlăul Piatra Neamț players
FC Politehnica Iași (2010) players
Liga I players
Liga II players
First Professional Football League (Bulgaria) players
Romanian expatriate footballers
Expatriate footballers in Bulgaria
Romanian expatriate sportspeople in Bulgaria
Sportspeople from Câmpulung